Euthria solifer is a species of sea snail, a marine gastropod mollusk in the family Buccinidae, the true whelks.

Description
The length of the shell attains 47.7 mm.

Distribution
This marine species occurs off New Caledonia.

References

 Fraussen, K.; Hadorn, R. (2003). Six new Buccinidae (Mollusca: Gastropoda) from New Caledonia. Novapex. 4(2-3): 33-50
 Bouchet, P.; Fontaine, B. (2009). List of new marine species described between 2002-2006. Census of Marine Life.

External links

Buccinidae
Gastropods described in 2003